Barrie Gavin  (born 10 June 1935) is a British film director.

Early years
Barrie Gavin was educated at St Paul's School, and studied history at Corpus Christi College, Cambridge from 1954 to 1957. He joined the BBC as an assistant film editor in 1961. With the opening of BBC Two in 1964 he began to direct programmes principally about music.

In the early years of BBC2 there was regular coverage of chamber music and Gavin learnt his craft with many studio-based productions. His experience in the cutting room led inevitably to the making of film documentaries.

Collaboration with Pierre Boulez
In 1966 his fascination with contemporary music brought him into contact with the French composer and conductor Pierre Boulez. Over the next 40 years they collaborated on a series of analytical documentaries on the founding fathers of 20th-century music: Schoenberg, Berg, Webern, Bartók, Stravinsky, Ives, Varese, Messiaen and of course Boulez himself. They made twelve films together: 

 Pierre Boulez: Portrait – Analysis – Performance, 1966
 The New Language of Music (Schönberg, Berg, Webern)
 The New Rhythm of Music (Bartók, Stravinsky)
 Telemarteau (Le marteau sans maître)
 The Outsiders (Ives, Varese)
 Olivier Messiaen: Vision and Revolution
 A Different Beauty (Webern) 1977
 The Doors are Open (conducting master classes in Lucerne)
 In Search of the Future (80th birthday portrait for German TV)
 Tomorrow Today (the Boulez years at the BBC) 2005
 Boulez Now (retrospective up to mid-1980s)
 Pierre Boulez: Living in the Present 2005

Portraits of contemporary composers 
From the 1970s until the end of the 20th century Gavin specialised in portraits of contemporary composers: Roberto Gerhard, Luciano Berio, Luigi Nono, George Benjamin, Karlheinz Stockhausen, John Adams, Sofia Gubaidulina, Aribert Reimann, Toru Takemitsu, Isang Yun, Harrison Birtwistle, Peter Maxwell Davies, Mark-Anthony Turnage, Oliver Knussen, Hans Werner Henze and many others.

Films on folk music 
In 1970 Barrie Gavin began to explore folk music with the writer and musician A. L. Lloyd. Together they travelled across the British Isles and visited Romania, Hungary, the United States. The death of A. L. Lloyd in 1984 brought this work to an end.

Years in Germany 
In 1977 Gavin had been invited to Germany to make a film about Kurt Weill. This marked the beginning of a long association with German television, resulting not only in many adventurous documentaries (mainly in Frankfurt for the producer Swantje Ehrentreich) but also in a new area of work, directing concerts for television. To date he has been responsible for some 250 relays of concerts and opera.

Collaboration with Sir Simon Rattle
In the 1980s Gavin began a collaboration with the conductor Sir Simon Rattle. They worked on a long series of productions with the City of Birmingham Symphony Orchestra. The list of films created together includes:

 1911 (a trilogy on a crucial year in music)
 From East to West (a trilogy on the influence of the East on classical music)
 A Symphony in Time of War (Stravinsky – Symphony in three movements)
 Young Apollo (the early works of Britten)
 Carl Nielsen: A Life in six Symphonies
 Leaving Home (a seven part series on the music of the 20th century)
 Sinfonia (Luciano Berio)
 The Middle of Life (Hans Werner Henze)
 A Romantic Imagination (3-part series on Berlioz)
 Stockhausen: Gruppen (documentary and performance)

Collaboration with Gerard McBurney
In 1989 he worked for the first time with the composer and writer Gerard McBurney. They have produced some ten films, many of them on Russian music, including Think Today, Speak Tomorrow and Giving Voice (two films on dissident composers in the Soviet Union) 1990 The Fire and the Rose (Sofia Gubaidulina) 1990 The Face behind the Face (Shostakovich).

In 2006 he began a collaboration with Gerard McBurney and the Chicago Symphony Orchestra on a series of music documentaries for the internet.  They have completed productions on music by Bartók, Mozart, Tchaikovsky, Shostakovich, Holst Vivaldi, Mussorgsky, Sibelius, Dvořák and Debussy. There were created the following films:

 Bartók – The Miraculous Mandarin 2006
 Mozart – Piano Concerto No. 27, K.595 2007
 Tchaikovsky – Symphony No. 4 2008
 Shostakovich – Symphony No. 4 2008
 Holst – The Planets: suite 2008
 Vivaldi – The 4 Seasons 2008
 Mussorgsky/Ravel – Pictures from an Exhibition 2008
 Sibelius – Symphony No. 5 2010
 Dvořák – Symphony No. 9 (From the New World) 2010
 Debussy – La Mer 2010

Films on arts and literature 
The vast majority of Gavin's work has concentrated on music, but he has also produced in 1967 a series on classic film directors. In addition there have been films on literature and the visual arts. Among them: Sir William in search of Xanadu (Award of Montreal Festival of Films on Art, 1984) and Images – A History of Early Photography (Award of New York Festival of Films on Art, 1989).

Recent projects
In 2007 he finished a film, Finding the Music in Croatia, on the composer Nigel Osborne. In 2008 he received an award from International Music Publisher' Association for Services to Contemporary Music. In 2009 he completed a film Towards and Beyond (Jonathan Harvey), a portrait of the composer. In 2010 he made two short films: A Mind of Winter (George Benjamin) and How Slow the Wind (Toru Takemitsu), using music by these composers. He also started work on a continuing series of archival, unedited interviews, mainly with contemporary composers.

Copies of many of Gavin's films on contemporary music have been deposited in the archives of the Paul Sacher Foundation in Basel, Switzerland.

Filmography 
All the Russias, 2002
Between Two Worlds: Erich Wolfgang Korngold, 2001
In Rehearsal: Christoph von Dohnányi with the Philharmonia Orchestra, 1998
American Dream: Stephen Collins Foster und seine Zeit, 1997
Leaving Home, 1996
Peter Grimes, 1995
The Fairy Queen, 1995
Soviet Echoes, 1995
Verdi, 1995
Cleveland Plays the Proms, 1994
Berlioz: Messe solennelle, 1993
Benjamin Britten: War Requiem, 1993
Georg Friedrich Händel: Messiah, 1992
Mlada, 1992
Hector Berlioz: Symphonie fantastique, 1991
Carmen by Georges Bizet, 1991
Opus 20 Modern Masterworks: Ernst Krenek, 1991
Billy Budd, 1988
Towards Antara, 1987
Leonardo, 1987
Crossover: Richard Rodney Bennett, 1987
The Tenor Man's Story, 1985
Guitarra, 1985
Ernest Ansermet: Archives and Memories, 1985
Ruddigore, 1982
But Still We Sing, 1979 
The Lively Arts, 1977–79
Robert Vas Film-maker, 1978
A Line Through the Labyrinth, 1977
Scenes from a Geordie Ceilidh, 1976
Omnibus, 1971–73
Aquarius, 1972
Music on 2, 1970
Masterworks, 1966

Videography
 New Year's Eve Concert 1992: Richard Strauss Gala, Kultur Video DVD, D4209, 2007

References

External links
 Biography at fernsehforum-musik.de
 
 
 
 Films (DVDs) at amazon.co.uk
 
 Beyond the Score
 But Still We Sing: A Journey Through the Music of the Hebrides (1979) on YouTube

1935 births
Alumni of Corpus Christi College, Cambridge
Living people
Film directors from London
English music video directors